Muito (Dentro da Estrela Azulada) (English: Much (In the blue star)) is an album by Brazilian singer and composer Caetano Veloso, released in 1978. The song "Sampa", which describes Veloso's first impressions of São Paulo city, was voted by the Brazilian edition of Rolling Stone as the 42nd greatest Brazilian song.

Track listing

All songs by Caetano Veloso except where noted otherwise
 "Terra" - 6:43
 "Tempo de estio" - 5:06	 	
 "Muito romântico" - 2:28 	
 "Quem cochicha o rabo espicha" (Jorge Ben) - 4:19
 "Eu sei que vou te amar" (Antonio Carlos Jobim, Vinicius de Moraes) - 3:52
 "Muito 3:23"
 "Sampa" - 3:17	
 "Love love love" - 3:04	 	
 "Cá já" - 5:59
 "São João, Xangô menino" (Caetano Veloso, Gilberto Gil) - 2:40
 "Eu te amo" - 3:59

Personnel

 Technical Writing: Paulinho "Chocolate" (Estúdio A), Vítor e Jairo (Estúdio B)
 Wizards: Rafael, Aníbal e Vítor
 Mixing: Paulinho "Chocolate"
 Cutting: Ivan Lisnik
 Production Director: Caetano Veloso
 Production Coordenation: Roberto Santana
 Cover: Aldo luiz
 Artwork: Arthur Fróes
 Photo: Januário Garcia

References

Caetano Veloso albums
1978 albums
Philips Records albums